Kurwa railway station (station code KURV) is at Kurwa village city in Dumka district in the Indian state of Jharkhand on the Jasidih–Rampurhat section. It is in the Howrah Division of the Eastern Railway zone of the Indian Railways.

The railway line has single  broad gauge track from Jasidih junction in Deoghar district in Santhal Pargana division of Jharkhand to Rampurhat in Birbhum district of West Bengal. This railway track to Dumka is a boon for Santhal Pargana Division.

The Kurwa railway station provides rail connectivity to the nearby villages Ramidinda, Khayerbani, Rampur, Andipur, Guhiajori.

History
Kurwa railway station became operational in 2014. The  segment from Dumka to Rampurhat became operational on 30 June 2014.

Station layout

Trains
One passenger train running between Jasidih Junction and Rampurhat stops at Kurwa railway station.

Gallery

Track layout

In popular culture 
The station name is famous in Poland because it's their word for 'prostitute'. It has also been adopted into the Polandball franchise when Poland is angry.

See also

References

External links 

 Ministry of Railways. (Official site)

 Official website of the Dumka district

Railway stations in Dumka district
Howrah railway division
Railway stations in India opened in 2014